is a Japanese professional footballer who plays as a defensive midfielder for and captains Bundesliga club VfB Stuttgart. He represents the Japan national team, playing mainly as a winger(striker).

Club career
Endo began his professional career with Shonan Bellmare. He later played for Sint-Truiden until 2019.

On 13 August 2019, Endo was loaned out to VfB Stuttgart until the end of the season. In April 2020, Stuttgart signed Endo permanently. On 26 November 2020, Endo extended his contract with VfB Stuttgart until June 2024.

On 25 February 2022, Endo scored Stuttgart's only goal in a 1–2 loss to TSG Hoffenheim. He scored again in the club's 3–2 win over Borussia Mönchengladbach. On 14 May 2022, he scored the winning goal in stoppage time in a 2–1 win over 1. FC Köln to save Stuttgart from the relegation playoffs and secure their place in the 2022–23 Bundesliga.

International career
On 23 July 2015, Japan's coach Vahid Halilhodžić called Endo up to the squad for the upcoming 2015 EAFF East Asian Cup. He was named in Japan's squad for the 2018 FIFA World Cup in Russia, although he did not play in any of their matches.

Career statistics

Club

International

Scores and results list Japan's goal tally first, score column indicates score after each Endo goal.

Honours
Shonan Bellmare
J.League Division 2: 2014

Urawa Red Diamonds
J.League Cup: 2016
Suruga Bank Championship: 2017
AFC Champions League: 2017

Japan U23
AFC U-23 Championship: 2016

Japan
AFC Asian Cup runner-up: 2019
Individual

 Japan Pro-Footballers Association awards: Best XI (2022)

References

External links

Profile at Urawa Reds

1993 births
Living people
Association football people from Kanagawa Prefecture
Japanese footballers
Association football defenders
Japan international footballers
Japan youth international footballers
J1 League players
J2 League players
Belgian Pro League players
Bundesliga players
2. Bundesliga players
Shonan Bellmare players
Urawa Red Diamonds players
Sint-Truidense V.V. players
VfB Stuttgart players
Footballers at the 2014 Asian Games
Footballers at the 2016 Summer Olympics
Olympic footballers of Japan
2018 FIFA World Cup players
2019 AFC Asian Cup players
Asian Games competitors for Japan
Footballers at the 2020 Summer Olympics
Japanese expatriate footballers
Japanese expatriate sportspeople in Belgium
Expatriate footballers in Belgium
Japanese expatriate sportspeople in Germany
Expatriate footballers in Germany
2022 FIFA World Cup players